Matt Kramer may refer to:

 Matt Kramer (musician), American singer formerly with rock band Saigon Kick
 Matt Kramer (wine writer), American wine writer